Shrew's Nest is a 2014 horror thriller film directed by Juanfer Andrés and Esteban Roel, and starring Macarena Gómez, Nadia de Santiago, Hugo Silva and Luis Tosar. It earned three nominations to the 29th Goya Awards, including Gómez for Best Actress.

Plot
The plot is set in the 1950s in an apartment in Madrid. Montse earns her living by working as a seamstress in her apartment. She has lost her youth taking care of her younger sister (referred to as "the girl"),  who bring some additional earnings to the household by working at a store outside. Montse is at odds with the prospect of her sister establishing intimate relationships with males, despite the girl actually coming of age. Their mother died during the girl's birth and their father ran away during the War, unable to handle the situation. And so, forced to act as father, mother and older sister, Montse hides from reality, feeding an obsessive, unhinged temperament, likewise experiencing visions of her abusive father mocking her. Suffering from agoraphobia, Montse is unable to get out of the apartment.

Carlos, a neighbor of Montse and the girl, falls down the stairs and looks for help knocking on the apartment's door, and Montse, despite early reluctance, eventually proceeds to drag an unconscious and injured Carlos in. Montse becomes nonetheless infatuated with Carlos, who, wounded in the leg, is unable to move out of bed. During secret meetings of the girl and Carlos, the former advises Carlos to leave the apartment as soon as possible, to no success, as Carlos left the altar on his wedding night and is on the run from commitment to his pregnant fiancée, because he does not want to deal with  the responsibilities as a husband and a father. Montse drugs the pain-afflicted Carlos with morphine supplied to her by Doña Puri, a regular client. Upon the attempts to break the impasse, a carnage ensues, as Montse is not willing to let Carlos go, coming to the point of sewing Carlos' leg to the bed. After killing Elisa (Carlos' fiancée, who is looking for him), Doña Puri and the latter's niece, the deranged Montse meets her demise at the hands of the girl, who is trying to facilitate Carlos' escape. In the wake of Montse's last words, the girl finds out that she actually is Montse's daughter, as her grief-stricken father raped Montse time after the death of Montse's mother. Instead of the father running away, Montse saw herself forced to kill him (via food poisoning) to put an end to his abusive and incestuous behavior on Montse herself and her innocent daughter, kept her father's body on her bed for weeks before storing his remains in the armoire, and was too ashamed to tell her the truth.

Out in the hallway, the girl drags Carlos out of her apartment and comforts him. Carlos then asks the girl what her actual name is, in which she whispers her name. Carlos smiles in response and remarks that "it is a beautiful name." The girl then goes back into her apartment and shuts the door as Carlos lies in the hallway barely breathing, his fate left uncertain.

Cast

Release 
The film had its world premiere on 4 September 2014, screened on the first day of the 39th Toronto International Film Festival. Distributed by Sony Pictures Releasing España, it was theatrically released in Spain on 25 December 2014.

Critical reception
Shrew's Nest has received generally positive reviews. Jordi Costa wrote for El País, "one could criticize Shrew's Nest for some underlinings and missteps, but it is an energetic debut film, capable of modulating with a good pulse the escalade towards its final excesses." Jonathan Holland of The Hollywood Reporter, while dismissing Hugo Silva's performance as "literally and metaphorically flat", claims that the film is an "enjoyable if unsubtle historical horror featuring a deliciously over-the-top central performance by Macarena Gómez."

On the negative side, Daniel Lobato wrote for eCartelera: "Explaining the reasons that make a failed proposal out of Shrew's Nest would require entering spoiler territory (...), so I will just say that the concord of credibility between viewer and author (...) breaks irreparably as soon as danger raises its head", and also criticizes Silva's performance, claiming that he "should at least have seen The Sea Inside before laying in bed."

Accolades

See also 
 List of Spanish films of 2014
 List of French films of 2014

Informational notes

References

External links 
 Shrews's Nest at ICAA's Catálogo de Cinespañol

2014 films
2010s Spanish-language films
Spanish horror thriller films
Films set in Madrid
Films set in the 1950s
Incest in film
Agoraphobia in fiction
Films about child sexual abuse
Films set in apartment buildings
Pokeepsie Films films
French horror thriller films
2010s Spanish films
2010s French films
2014 directorial debut films